Pusong Mamon (English Title: Soft Hearts) is a 1998 Philippine romantic comedy film directed by Joel Lamangan.

The film was rated PG-13 due to sexual elements, Eric Quizon who was one of the cast members confirmed in an interview that there will be a sequel of Pusong Mamon 2 to be seen in theaters in mid-2012 produced by VIVA Films after 16 years.

Plot
Unaware of her co-worker's sexuality, Annie tries to seduce Ron. Annie gets a few drinks into Ron, then has her way with him while he's drunk in his car. After learning she's pregnant, she moves in with him despite her discovery that he is gay and living with a boyfriend Nick. Together, the trio navigates their way through a minefield of romantic difficulties while discovering the true meaning of love.

Cast
Lorna Tolentino as Annie
Eric Quizon as Nick
Albert Martinez as Ron
Eugene Domingo
Caridad Sanchez
Jake Roxas
Tony Mabesa
Matthew Mendoza

References

External links 
 

1998 films
Philippine LGBT-related films
1990s Tagalog-language films
1998 romantic comedy films
Philippine romantic comedy films
Films directed by Joel Lamangan
Films directed by Eric Quizon
1998 LGBT-related films